Emre Tetikel (born 2 August 1985) is a Turkish cinema, television and theater actor, teacher and author. He is best known for his role as "Berk" in the film Ayakta Kal and "Şahin" in the TV series Karagül in Turkey.

Early life 
Originally from Tekirdağ, he was born in 1985 in Tekirdağ and raised there. He graduated from Namik Kemal High School. He was interested in acting during his secondary school and high school education and took part in Tekirdağ City theater and amateur theater groups.

Career 
Tetikel left Tekirdağ for university education and settled in Istanbul and graduated from Newport University of California with a distance education in English business administration. In 2008, he met Selçuk Uluergüven. Theater types such as Uluergüven and Aykut Oray took theater education, took part in various theater plays together and became professional. He continued his acting education in Bahariye art center, New York City dramatic art conservatory, NY film academy and Ekol drama. He took part in television and internet advertisements during his student years. In 2008, he portrayed the character "Morphy Mcmahon" in the TV series Dur Yolcu, and he appeared in a television series for the first time.

He played the character of "Berk" in his first lead movie, Ayakta Kal, which was released on 16 January 2009. After a few commercials, motion pictures and series, he won the appreciation of the Turkish audience with the character "Sahin" that he played in Karagül TV series. He revived the character "Engin" in Son Çıkış. He also portrayed the character of "Teoman" in the TV series Adini Sen Koy in 2019. He worked as a theater teacher in many colleges and private acting education institutions in Tekirdağ and İstanbul, and trained students for conservatory education.

In April 2019, Emre Tetikel participated in Reality show called "Seven cities of love", which was a competition film with the presence of Iranian and foreign film and television actors with the aim of showing interests and getting acquainted with the culture of other countries of the world. Also in the same year, he appeared in the "ninth season" of the "Iranian Dinner" competition directed by Saeid Aboutaleb and played a role and collaborated in this series.

Emre Tetikel is also an author. He has a novel named "Yalniz Ask’a Siginmak" published in 2015.

Filmography

TV series

Reality Show

Films

Theater

Short films

Bibliography

References

External links 
 
 

1985 births
21st-century Turkish male actors
Turkish male models
Male actors from Istanbul
Living people
Turkish male television actors
Turkish male film actors